Mihai Pârlog (born 9 March 1974) is a retired Romanian football midfielder.

References

1974 births
Living people
Romanian footballers
FC Petrolul Ploiești players
FC Progresul București players
FC Argeș Pitești players
ASC Daco-Getica București players
FC Unirea Urziceni players
Association football midfielders